NAIP may refer to:

 NAIP (gene) or NLR family, apoptosis inhibitory protein, a human gene
 National Agriculture Imagery Program of the USDA Farm Service Agency
 Naval Acquisition Intern Program, see Naval Acquisition Career Center
the North Atlantic Igneous Province, centred on Iceland